The 2015–16 Nemzeti Bajnokság I/A was the 84th season of the Nemzeti Bajnokság I/A, the highest tier professional basketball league in Hungary.

Teams 

The following 14 clubs competed in the NB I/A during the 2015–16 season:

Personnel and kits

Regular season (Alapszakasz)

Results

Second round (Középszakasz)

1st – 5th Placement (Felsőház)

Results

6th – 10th Placement (Középház)

Results

11th – 14th Placement (Alsóház)

Results

Playoffs
Teams in bold won the playoff series. Numbers to the left of each team indicate the team's original playoff seeding. Numbers to the right indicate the score of each playoff game.

Finals
In the finals, teams play against each other which must win three games to win the title. Thus, if one team win three games before all five games have been played, the remaining games are omitted. The team that finished in the higher Regular season place will be played the first, the third and the fifth (if it is necessary) game of the series at home.

Game 1

Game 2

Game 3

Game 4

Szolnoki Olaj KK won the FINAL series 3–1.

Play-out
13th placed team hosted Games 1, plus Game 3 if necessary. 14th placed team hosted Game 2.

Season statistics

Number of teams by counties

Hungarian clubs in European competitions
 Eurocup
Szolnoki Olaj

 FIBA Europe Cup

Sopron

Falco KC

Körmend

Final standings

External links
 Hungarian Basketball Federaration 

Nemzeti Bajnoksag I/A (men's basketball) seasons
Hungarian
Men